International match points (IMP) within the card game of contract bridge is a measurement for conversion of the absolute contract bridge scores. The total point difference between two scores is compared to a scale ranging from 1 to 24.

IMP score is used in competition bridge, including duplicate bridge (including at some online bridge websites), but rarely within any kind of companion bridge, and never if playing rubber bridge.

Tactics at IMPs differ from those of matchpoints and are similar to those of rubber bridge. The declarer's primary objective is to make the contract without jeopardizing it in a quest for overtricks; for the defense it is to defeat the contract without worrying about surrendering overtricks.

References

Contract bridge